Church Road is an unincorporated community in Dinwiddie County, Virginia, United States. Church Road has a post office with ZIP code 23833.

References

Unincorporated communities in Dinwiddie County, Virginia
Unincorporated communities in Virginia